The Indian media consists of several different types of communications of mass media: television, radio, cinema, newspapers, magazines, and Internet-based websites/portals. Indian media was active since the late 18th century. The print media started in India as early as 1780. Radio broadcasting began in 1927. Today much of the media is controlled by large, corporations, which reap revenue from advertising, subscriptions, and sale of copyrighted material.

India has over 500 satellite channels (more than 80 are news channels) and 70,000 newspapers, the biggest newspaper market in the world with over 100 million copies sold each day.

The French NGO Reporters Without Borders compiles and publishes an annual ranking of countries based upon the organisation's assessment of its Press Freedom Index. In 2022, India was ranked 150th out of 180 countries, which declined from 133rd rank in 2016. It stated that this was due to Prime Minister Narendra Modi's Bharatiya Janata Party and their followers of Hindutva having greater exertion of control of the media. Freedom House, a US-based NGO stated in its 2021 report that harassment of journalists increased under Modi's administration. The English-language media of India are described as traditionally left-leaning liberal, which has been a point of friction recently due to an upsurge in popularity of Hindu nationalist politics. According to BBC News, "A look at Indian news channels - be it English or Hindi - shows that fairly one-sided news prevails. And that side is BJP and Hindutva."

Hicky's Bengal Gazette, founded in 1780, was the first Indian newspaper. Auguste and Louis Lumière moving pictures were screened in Bombay during July 1895, and radio broadcasting began in 1927.

Press Council of Indian act 1978 
The Press Council of India acts as a mechanism for the press to regulate itself. It ensures that the Indian press is free and responsible. If the press is to function effectively as the watchdog of public interest, it must have a secure freedom of expression, unfettered and unhindered by any authority, organised bodies, or individuals. It ensures that the press must, therefore, scrupulously adhere to accepted norms of journalistic ethics and maintain high standards of professional conduct.

Where the norms are breached and the freedom is defiled by unprofessional conduct, a way must exist to check and control it. But control by the government or official authorities may prove destructive of this freedom. Therefore, the best way is to let the peers of the profession, assisted by a few discerning laymen, regulate it through a properly structured, representative, and impartial machinery. Hence, the Press Council of India was established.

Overview 
The traditional print media, but also the television media, are largely family-owned and often partake in self-censorship, primarily due to political ties by the owner and the establishment. However, the new media are generally more professional and corporate-owned, though these, too, have been acquired or affiliated with established figures. At the same time, the Indian media, viewed as "feisty," have also not reported on issues of the media itself.

Print 

The first newspaper printed in India was Hicky's Bengal Gazette, started in 1780 under the British Raj by James Augustus Hicky. Other newspapers such as The India Gazette, The Calcutta Gazette, The Madras Courier (1785), and The Bombay Herald (1789) soon followed. These newspapers carried news of the areas under the British rule. The Bombay Samachar, founded in 1822 and printed in Gujarati is the oldest newspaper in Asia still in print. On 30 May 1826 Udant Martand (The Rising Sun), the first Hindi-language newspaper published in India, started from Calcutta (now Kolkata), published every Tuesday by Pt. Jugal Kishore Shukla.

Even after independence from Britain in 1947, the English-language papers were prominent due to a number of reasons. The telegraphic circuits of news agencies used the Roman Alphabet and the Morse code, giving the English press an advantage in speed. The speed of typesetting was also much slower in Indian languages because of the Diacritics. Also, the press largely relied on advertisements of imported goods for revenue, and the foreign advertisers naturally preferred English-language media. The language of the administration had also remained English.

Currently India publishes about 1,000 Hindi dailies that have a total circulation of about 80 million copies. English, the second language in terms of number of daily newspapers, has about 250 dailies with a circulation of about 40 million copies. The prominent Hindi newspapers are Dainik Jagran, Dainik Bhaskar, Amar Ujala, Devbhumi Mirror, Navbharat Times, Hindustan Dainik, Prabhat Khabar, Rajasthan Patrika, and Dainik Aaj.

In terms of readership, Dainik Jagran is the most popular Hindi daily with a total readership (TR) of 70,377,000, according to IRS Q1 2019. Dainik Bhaskar is the second most popular with a total readership of 51,405,000. Amar Ujala with a TR of 47,645,000, Rajasthan Patrika with a TR of 18,036,000 and Prabhat Khabar with a TR of 14,102,000 are placed at the next three positions. The total readership of the top 10 Hindi dailies is estimated at 188.68 million, nearly five times that of the top 10 English dailies that have a 38.76 million total readership.

The prominent English newspapers are The Times of India, founded in 1838 as The Bombay Times and Journal of Commerce by Bennett, Coleman and Co. Ltd, a colonial enterprise now owned by an Indian conglomerate; The Times Group. The Hindustan Times was founded in 1924 during the Indian Independence Movement ('Hindustan' being the historical name of India), it is published by HT Media Ltd. The Hindu was founded in 1878 by a group known as the Triplicane Six consisting of four law students and two teachers in Madras (now Chennai), it is now owned by The Hindu Group.

In the 1950s, 214 daily newspapers were published in the country. Out of these, 44 were English language dailies while the rest were published in various regional and national languages. This number rose to 3,805 dailies in 1993 with the total number of newspapers published in the country having reached 35,595.

The main regional newspapers of India include the Marathi language Lokmat, the Gujarati Language Gujarat Samachar, the Malayalam language Malayala Manorama, the Tamil language Daily Thanthi, the Telugu language Eenadu, the Kannada language Vijaya Karnataka and the Bengali language Anandabazar Patrika.

Newspaper sales in the country increased by 11.22% in 2007. By 2007, 62 of the world's best selling newspaper dailies were published in China, Japan, and India. India consumed 99 million newspaper copies as of 2007—making it the second largest market in the world for newspapers.

Dailies in India 
Top 10 Hindi Dailies

Ref: Indian Readership Survey Q4 2019 pdf

Top 10 English dailies

Ref: Indian Readership Survey Q1 2019 [1]

Top 10 regional dailies

Ref: Indian Readership Survey Q1 2019

Magazines in India 
Top 10 Hindi magazines

Ref: Indian Readership Survey Q1 2019 

Top 10 English magazines

Ref: Indian Readership Survey Q1 2019 

Top 10 regional magazines

Ref: Indian Readership Survey Q1 2019

Broadcasting 

Radio broadcasting was initiated in 1927 but became a state responsibility only in 1930. In 1937 it was given the name All India Radio and since 1957 it has been called Akashvani. Limited duration of television programming began in 1959, and complete broadcasting followed in 1965. The Ministry of Information and Broadcasting owned and maintained the audio-visual apparatus—including the television channel Doordarshan—in the country prior to the economic reforms of 1991. The Government of India played a significant role in using the audio-visual media for increasing mass education in India's rural swathes. Projected television screens provided engaging education in India's villages by the 1990s.In 1997, an autonomous body was established in the name of Prasar Bharti to take care of the public service broadcasting under the Prasar Bharti Act. All India Radio and Doordarshan, which earlier were working as media units under the Ministry of I&B became constituents of the body.

Following the economic reforms satellite television channels from around the world—including the BBC, CNN, CNBC, and other foreign television channels gained a foothold in the country. 47 million households with television sets emerged in 1993, which was also the year when Rupert Murdoch entered the Indian market. Satellite and cable television soon gained a foothold. Doordarshan, in turn, initiated reforms and modernisation. With 1,400 television stations as of 2009, the country ranks 4th in the list of countries by number of television broadcast stations.

On 16 November 2006, the Government of India released the community radio policy which allowed agricultural centres, educational institutions and civil society organisations to apply for a community-based FM broadcasting licence. Community radio is allowed 100 watt effective radiated power (ERP) with a maximum tower height of 30 Metres. The licence is valid for five years and one organisation can only get one licence, which is non-transferable and to be used for community development purposes.

Communications 

The Indian Government acquired ES EVM computers from the Soviet Union, which were used in large companies and research laboratories. Tata Consultancy Services – established in 1968 by the Tata Group – were the country's largest software producers during the 1960s. The 'microchip revolution' of the 1980s had convinced both Indira Gandhi and her successor Rajiv Gandhi that electronics and telecommunications were vital to India's growth and development. MTNL underwent technological improvements. Between 1986 and 1987, the Indian government embarked upon the creation of three wide-area computer networking schemes: INDONET (intended to serve the IBM mainframes in India), NICNET (network for the National Informatics Centre), and the academic research oriented Education and Research Network (ERNET).

The Indian economy underwent economic reforms in 1991, leading to a new era of globalisation and international economic integration. Economic growth of over 6% annually was seen between 1993 and 2002. The economic reforms were driven in part by significant the internet usage in India. The new administration under Atal Bihari Vajpayee—which placed the development of Information technology among its top five priorities— formed the Indian National Task Force on Information Technology and Software Development. Internet gained a foothold in India by 1998. India had a total of 100 million Internet users—comprising 8.5% of the country's population—by 2010. By 2010, 13 million people in India also had access to broadband Internet— making it the 10th largest country in the world in terms of broadband Internet users.

India had a total of 34 million fixed lines in use by 2011. In the fixed line arena, BSNL and MTNL are the incumbents in their respective areas of operation and continue to enjoy the dominant service provider status in the domain of fixed line services. BSNL controls 79% of fixed line share in the country.

In the mobile telephony sector, Bharti Airtel controls 24.3% subscriber base followed by Reliance Communications with 18.9%, Vodafone with 18.8%, BSNL with 12.7% subscriber base as of June 2009. India had a total of 880 million mobile phone connections by 2011. Total fixed-line and wireless subscribers reached 688 million as of August 2010.

Motion pictures 

The history of film in India begins with the screening of Auguste and Louis Lumière moving pictures in Bombay during the July 1895. Raja Harishchandra, a full-length feature film, was initiated in 1912 and completed later. Alam Ara (released 14 March 1931), directed by Ardeshir Irani, was the first Indian movie with dialogues.

Indian films were soon being followed throughout Southeast Asia and the Middle East—where modest dressing and subdued sexuality of these films was found to be acceptable to the sensibilities of the audience belonging to the various Islamic countries of the region. As cinema as a medium gained popularity in the country as many as 1,000 films in various languages of India were produced annually. Hollywood also gained a foothold in India with special effects films such as Jurassic Park (1993) and Speed (1994) being specially appreciated by the local audiences. Expatriates throughout the United Kingdom and in the United States continued to give rise to an international audiences to Indian movies, which, according to The Encyclopædia Britannica (2008) entry on Bollywood, "continued to be formulaic story lines, expertly choreographed fight scenes, spectacular song-and-dance routines, emotion-charged melodrama, and larger-than-life heroes". Present-day India produces the most films of any country in the world. Major media investors in the country are production houses such as Yash Raj Films, Dharma Productions, Aamir Khan Productions, Disney India and Reliance Entertainment. Most of these productions are funded by investors since there are limited banking and credit facilities maturity in India for the motion picture industry. Many international corporations, such as Disney (formerly UTV) and Viacom (Network18 Studios) have entered the nation's media industry on a large scale.

Digital and online media 
The early 2000s saw the advent of online and digital publishing in India. Traditional print dailies were the first to adapt and introduce their own digital versions of their print dailies and magazines. Today, India is the home of many online publications including digital-only news outlets, Magazines, news portals and publishing houses.

List of notable digital-only publications 
(alphabetical order)
 Altnews.in
 Cobrapost
 Dailyhunt (aggregator)
 Firstpost
 India Times
 Khabar Lahariya
 Newslaundry
 One India
 People's Archive of Rural India
 Pinkvilla
 ScoopWhoop
 SheThePeople.TV
 Scroll.in
 The Better India
 Two Circles
 The Chenab Times
 The Lallantop
 The News Minute
 ThePrint
 The Quint
 The Wire (India)

Defense news reporting in India 

India has fought four wars since its independence from the British in 1947. It has long running insurgency problems in Jammu & Kashmir, the border state with Pakistan and also in the northeastern states, apart from internal security challenges. It has led to sustained audience interest in the issues related to national security and defence. Leading English and Hindi dailies cover defence issues in a major way, but niche defence specific reporting and publications have also taken root in the last 10 years.

List 
 Sainik Samachar
 Indian Military Review

Ownership and funding 

Digital media is opening up to paywalls and other subscription based models. However a majority of readers still do not pay for the content they read, causing the media houses to rely on other means of funding.

Independent and Public Spirited Media Trust is a syndicate that promotes media in India with the aim of creating a news content creation network. It was founded in 2015 and funds organisations such as The Wire, IndiaSpend, CGNet Swara, AltNews, and The Caravan. Omidyar Network has invested in Scroll.in and Newslaundry. Odisha TV is owned by the Panda Family, Baijayant Jay Panda. NewsLive in Assam is run by the wife of Himanta Biswa Sarma. The Caravan points out that NDTV, News Nation, India TV, News24 and Network18 are linked to Reliance. Another Indian billionaire businessman who funds media is Subhash Chandra.

Funding ideology 
Investor Rohini Nilekani explains her ideology as follows:

Criticism 
Some sections of Indian media, controlled by businessmen, Politicians, and government bureaucrats, are facing criticism for biased, motivated reporting, behave like one party owned or governing party owned and selective presentation. After the devastating earthquake in Nepal on 25 April 2015, in spite of India helping, tweets from Nepal trended effectively saying, "Go home, Indian media". Disturbed by corruption, Delhi chief Minister Arvind Kejriwal suggested on 3 May 2015 to have a public trial of Indian media. On 8 May 2015, the then I & B Minister, Arun Jaitley echoed a similar rhetoric saying that there was a, "flood of channels but dearth of facts". Of late, a lot of mainstream media channels have been accused of printing and telecasting unverified and biased news which they retracted later. In a few instances content from Twitter's parody accounts were cited as a source. Indian mainstream media has often been accused of showing sensationalized news items. In March 2018, the then Chief Justice of India Dipak Misra said that, "journalists cannot write anything they imagine and behave as if they are sitting in some pulpit". Godi media is a pejorative term coined &  popularised by NDTV journalist Ravish Kumar referring to the sensationalist and biased Indian mainstream media which supports the ruling party of India.

It is also criticised for its overly creative reporting especially during COVID 19 pandemic and floods in 2018, 2019, 2020 and 2021 which can create unwanted fear in the minds of viewers.

Chief Justice of India N. V. Ramana criticized Indian media in a speech in July 2022 accusing the media of running Kangaroo courts and running agenda driven debates without any accountability, which he thinks is bad for democracy.

A report by Oxfam and Newslaundry found out that employees from general category constitute around 90% of leadership positions in the Indian media, which means that the marginalized communities like Dalits, Adivasis and Bahujans do not have adequate representation.

See also 
 Yellow journalism
 Sensationalism
 List of television stations in India
 List of Indian-language radio stations
 List of magazines in India
 List of journalists killed in India
 Open access in India
 Fake news in India

Notes and References

Bibliography 
 Burra, Rani Day & Rao, Maithili (2006), "Cinema", Encyclopaedia of India (vol. 1) edited by Stanley Wolpert, pp. 252–259, Thomson Gale, .
 Chand, Vikram K. (2006), Reinventing public service delivery in India: Selected Case Studies, Sage Publications, .
 Desai, Ashok V. (2006), "Information and other Technology Development", Encyclopaedia of India (vol. 2) edited by Stanley Wolpert, pp. 269–273, Thomson Gale, .
 Schwartzberg, Joseph E. (2008), India, Encyclopædia Britannica.
 Sharma, Shalendra D. (2006), "Globalisation", Encyclopaedia of India (vol. 2) edited by Stanley Wolpert, pp. 146–149, Thomson Gale, .
 Thomas, Raju G. C. (2006), "Media", Encyclopaedia of India (vol. 3) edited by Stanley Wolpert, pp. 105–107, Thomson Gale, .
 Watson, James L. (2008), Globalisation, Encyclopædia Britannica.
 Wolcott, P. & Goodman, S. E. (2003), Global Diffusion of the Internet – I India: Is the Elephant Learning to Dance?, Communications of the Association for Information Systems, 11: 560–646.

Further reading
 Malone, David M., C. Raja Mohan, and Srinath Raghavan, eds. The Oxford handbook of Indian foreign policy (2015) excerpt pp 259–270.

 
India
India